The Unión de Radioaficionados Españoles (URE) (in English, Spanish Amateur Radio Union) is a national non-profit organization for amateur radio enthusiasts in Spain.  The organization has approximately 8,000 members, predominantly amateur radio operators in Spain.  URE promotes amateur radio by sponsoring amateur radio operating awards and radio contests. 
The URE also represents the interests of Spanish amateur radio operators and shortwave listeners before Spanish and international telecommunications regulatory authorities.  URE is the national member society representing Spain in the International Amateur Radio Union.

See also 
International Amateur Radio Union

References 

Spain
Clubs and societies in Spain
Radio in Spain
Organisations based in Madrid